Laurent Debrosse (born October 2, 1969 in Saint-Vallier, Saône-et-Loire, France) is a French former professional footballer. He played as a midfielder.

External links
Laurent Debrosse profile at chamoisfc79.fr

1969 births
Living people
French footballers
Association football midfielders
Olympique Lyonnais players
LB Châteauroux players
Chamois Niortais F.C. players
Grenoble Foot 38 players
Ligue 1 players
Ligue 2 players